Lesley Veronica Campbell  is an Australian endocrinologist and Professor of Medicine with a special interest in clinical diabetes, appetite and metabolism. She is a principal research fellow at the Garvan Institute of Medical Research in Sydney, Australia.

Education and career 
Campbell graduated from Sydney University in 1968. She became a member of the Royal College of Physicians in Great Britain  and the Royal Australasian College of Physicians in 1973. She joined the Garvan Institute 1979 as a principal researcher and has remained there since and is the group leader of their Diabetes and Obesity Clinical Studies program. She is also director of diabetes services at St Vincent's Hospital in Sydney. She was appointed Professor of Medicine at the University of New South Wales. Campbell published more than 240 scientific papers. She is an advocate of an attitude that does not stigmatise those that are overweight or the parents of obese children and points out that 30% of those considered as obese are actually in good health.

Awards and recognition 
Campbell was awarded Fellowship of both the Royal Australasian College of Physicians (1977) and the British Royal College of Physicians (1989).

Publications 

 Campbell, L. V.; Chisholm, D. J. (1999), 'The United Kingdom prospective diabetes study (UKPDS)', in Diabetes in the New Millenium, edn. Original, Endocrinology & Diabetes Research Foundation, Sydney, NSW, pp. 219 - 226
Campbell, L.; Rubin, A. L. (2011), 'Diabetes for Dummies', John Wiley & Sons Inc, US. . 
Campbell, L. (2012), 'Type 2 Diabetes for Dummies', John Wiley & Sons Inc, US. .

References 

Living people
Year of birth missing (living people)
Members of the Order of Australia
Australian endocrinologists
Women endocrinologists
Australian medical researchers
University of Sydney alumni